Barbara Jordan (born 1949) is an American poet and academic. She is a professor of English at University of Rochester, and Plutzik Memorial Series director. Her work has appeared in Paris Review, Sulfur, The Atlantic, The New Yorker, Harvard Review.

Awards
 1989 Barnard Women Poets Prize

Works

Essays

Reviews
Barbara Jordan's second collection, while more syntactically scumbled and abstract than her first, proceeds in a similar manner. Like a botanist crossed with a postulant, Jordan maps onto the natural world the disquieted speculations of a religious contemplative. In "Meander," Jordan calls on the renowned Bishop of Hippo to illustrate her method: 
"Consciousness as landscape, / 
Augustine was mindful of it. `The caverns of memory,' / 
he wrote, / 
`the mountains and hills of my high imagination.'" 
The consciousness that permeates Jordan's landscapes, however, is of a decidedly more modern, Poundian variety.

References

External links
 "What Poems", The Writer's Almanac

1949 births
Living people
University of Rochester faculty
American women poets
American women academics
20th-century American poets
21st-century American poets
20th-century American women writers
21st-century American women writers